The highest-selling digital singles in the United States are ranked in the Hot Digital Songs chart, published by Billboard magazine. The data are compiled by Nielsen SoundScan based on each single's weekly digital sales, which combines sales of different versions of a single for a summarized figure.

Despite it never having reached number one on the weekly chart, having peaked at number two, the best-performing digital song of the 2007 chart year was "Big Girls Don't Cry" by Fergie.

Chart history

See also
2007 in music
Digital Songs

References

United States Digital Songs
2007